The members of the first Iraqi Council of Representatives were elected in December 2005 under the newly adopted constitution.

The main functions of the Council were to:

 Elect the first permanent government of Iraq since the invasion and occupation of Iraq by United States and allied forces in 2003
 Discuss amendments to the constitution
 Implement various element of the constitution including nominating members of the judiciary, resolving the status of Kirkuk and establishing Regions.

Votes chose between coalition lists, and seats were allocated according to a formula that considered first the proportion of votes received in each governorate and then allocated compensatory national seats to those lists where the governorate seats did not reflect their share of the national vote. Individual members were then nominated by the lists.

Where members of the Council of Representative are appointed to the Council of Ministers or the Presidency Council they have to resign their seat and the coalition list must appoint a replacement member. The same is the case if a member dies, resigns, is disqualified or incapacitated or is deemed to have "committed a crime against the constitution"

United Iraqi Alliance - 128 seats

Supreme Islamic Iraqi Council

SIIC was previously known as the Supreme Council for the Islamic Revolution in Iraq or SCIRI

Abd al-Aziz Muhsin Mahdi al-Hakim Leader of the United Iraqi Alliance
Ijra' Faysal Udah
Basimah Aziz Nasir
Jinan Jasim al-Ubaydi
AbdulAmeer AbdAzahra
Hamid Rashid Ma`ala
Rida Jawad Taqi
Abdul Jabar Raheef
Salim Jasur Hasun
Layla Thamir Fakhir
Majeed Khayr Allah Rahi
Fathiyah Abd al-Halim Abd al-Karim
Muhammad Taqi Ali al-Mawla (an ethnic Iraqi Turkmen)
Jalal al-Din Ali al-Saghir (Badr Organization)
Iqball Khalil Ghani (Badr Organization)
Iman Khalil Sha`alan (Badr Organization)
Tahsin `Abd Matar (Badr Organization)
Ra'idah Freini Bawi (Badr Organization)
Diya' al-Din Muhammad al-Fayyad (Badr Organization)
Abd al-Karim Abd al-Sahib (Badr Organization)
Muhammad Rajih Alwan (Badr Organization)
Muhammad Husayn Salih (Badr Organization)
Muhammad Naji Muhammad Ali (Badr Organization)
Muhammad Mahdi Ameen (Badr Organization)
Muna Nur Zalzalah (Badr Organization)
Nidal Ta`an Abbas (Badr Organization)
Hadi Farhan al-Amiri (Badr Organization)
Hadi Abd Allah Bash (Badr Organization)
Hammam Baqir Abd al-Hamid Hammudi (Badr Organization)

Sadrist Movement

Note: the Sadrist Movement boycotted the Council of Representatives from 13 June to 17 July 2007 in protest of the 2007 al-Askari Mosque bombing

Note that the Sadrist Movement quit the United Iraq Alliance in September 2007

Ahmad Hasan Ali
Adibah Musa Shahd
Amirah Jasim Khalaf
Intisar Jasim Muhammad Rida
Iman Jalal Muhammad
Balqis Kuli Muhammad
Baha' al-A`raji
Tahsin Hameed Khulayf
Hasan Tu`mah al-Rubay`i
Haneen Mahmoud Al Qudw
Husayn Amir Radi
Haydar Sa`id Isma`il
Zaynab Karim al-Juburi
Salam Udah al-Maliki
Salih Hasan Isa
Adil Salih Majid
Aliyah Hamzah Duwayj
Aqil Abd Husayn Sajit
Allawi Madlul Hamzah
Alwan Habib Husayn
Ghufran Abbud Husayn
Fawzi Akram Samin
Falah Hasan Shanshal
Qusay Abd al-Wahhab Abbud al-Suhayl
Liqa' Ja`far Muntazir
Majidah Husayn Dashar
Maha Adil al-Duri
Nasir Hashim Tha`lab
Nassar Saghir Darbi

Islamic Virtue Party

Note that the Islamic Virtue Party left the United Iraqi Alliance in March 2007. They had previously quit the government of Nouri al-Maliki in March 2006 - see Government of Iraq from 2006 for more information.

Basim Jasim Nur
Basim Sharif Nasid
Bushra Jabbar Badan
Jabir Khalifah Jabir
Hasan Halbus al-Shammari
Karim Muhsin Hasan
Zahra' Abbas al-Hashimi
Siham Kazim Salman
Sabah Julub Falih
Ammar Tu`mah Abd al-Abbas
Kamilah Kazim Muhammad
Muhammad Kazim Khalif
Muhammad Isma`il Hasan
Mukhlis Balasim Sa`dun
Nadim Isa al-Jabiri

Islamic Dawa Party

Ali Muhammad Salih al-Adib
Haidar al-Abbadi
Jinan Abd al-Jabbar Yasin
Hasan Hameed Hasan
Ibrahim Abd al-Karim al-Ja`fari (split in 2007 to the National Reform Trend)
Jabir Abd al-Kazim Salman
Shahid Husayn Matar
Falah Faysal al-Fayyad (split in 2007 to the National Reform Trend) 
Kamal Khalawi Abd Allah
Najihah Abd al-Amir Abd al-Karim
Nada Abd Allah al-Sudani

Islamic Dawa Party - Iraq Organisation

Kasim Muhammad Taqi al-Sahlani
Iman Hamid Ali
Khalid Ubayd Jazi`
Sahar jaber Ata
Khawla Abdul Sadeq
Suad Hameed Lafteh
Abd al-Hadi Muhammad al-Hasani
Abd Ali Laftah Ni`mah
Adilah Hammud Husayn
Ali Hussain al-Alaq
Qasim `Atiyah al-Juburi
Muna Husayn Abd Ali
Na`imah Salman Abbas
Abd al-Karim Ali al-Anazi

Independents

Ahmad Jasim Muhammad al-Zubaydi
Inaam Ali Al Jawadi
Jabir Habib Jabir
Amer Thamer Ali
Haydar Karim Fahd al-Suwaydi
Haydar Sabkhi al-Jurani
Khalid Abadhir al-Atiyah
Zakiyah Isma`il Haqi
Sami Jasim al-Askari
Samirah Ja`far al-Musawi
Shatha Mousa Sadiq
Taha Der'e Taha
Abidah Ahmad Dakhil al-Ta'i
Amirah Muhammad al-Baldawi
Abbas Hasan al-Bayati (an ethnic Iraqi Turkmen)
Abd al-Wahhab Abd al-Hakim al-Safi
Qassim Daoud
Qays Sa`d al-Amiri
Lamiya' Na`imah Dawud
Muhammad Muhammad Salih al-Haydari
Muhammad Izz al-Din al-Khatib
Mazhar Husayn al-Hakim
Malhan Imran al-Mkoter
Hashim Rida Ali
Hana' Turki Abd al-Ta'i
Hayfa' Majli Ja`far

Others

Jamal Ja`far Muhammad Ali
Daghir Jasim Kazim
Feriad Omar Abdullah

Layla Kadhem Jasim ??

Kurdistani Alliance - 53 seats

1. Ablahad Afraim Sawa - Chaldean Democratic Union
2. Ahlam Asa'ad Mohamed
3. Ahmad Yousef Mousa
4. Ahmad Anwar Mohamed
5. Ismail Shaker Rasool
6. Akram Qader Mohamed
7. Alla Tahseen Habeeb - Patriotic Union of Kurdistan
8. Azad Omar Hasan
9. Asia Ahmad Khalid
10. Azad Rafeeq Tawfeeq
11. Baized Hasan Abd Alla
12. Bukhari Abd Alla Khadar
13. Barham Salih - Patriotic Union of Kurdistan
14. Tania Tala'at Mohamed
15. Jalal Talabani - Patriotic Union of Kurdistan
16. Hasan Othman Mohamed
17. Khalid Salam Saeed (an ethnic Yazidi)
18. Darkhshan Mohamed afandi
19. Rabha Hamad Abd Alla
20. Rawoof Othman Ma'aroof
21. Rooz Nouri Sedeq
22. Zaian Anwar Rasheed
23. Samia Azeez Mohamed
24. Sa'adi Ismail Abd Al Kareem
25. Suzan Mohamed Mohamed Ameen
26. Serwan Adnan Merza
27. Aref Tayfour - Kurdistan Democratic Party of Iraq
28. Ass Husain Mohamed
29. Abd Al Khaleq Mohamed Rasheed
30. Abd Al Rahman Ali Mohamed
31. Abd Alla Saleh Hafth Alla
32. Abd Alla Mohamed Ali
33. Abd Al Bari Mohamed Fares
34. Ali Hisain Balo
35. Farzandah Ahmad Qsaim
36. Feriad Mohamed Taqi Hasan
37. Fawzi Franso Hariri - Kurdistan Democratic Party of Iraq
38. Faian Sedeq Mustafa
39. Kamilia Ibrahim Ahmad
40. Kian Kamel Hasan
41. Lateef Haji Hasan
42. Laila Mohamed Qahraman
43. Laila Ali Karam
44. Muhsen Sa'adoon Ahmad
45. Mohamed Shareef Ahmad
46. Mohamed Reda Mohamed Mahmoud
47. Mohamed Fouad Maasoum Khader
48. Mahmoud Othman - Kurdish Socialist Party
49. Nazneen Husain Faed Alla
50. Nozad Saleh Refa'at
51. Hoshyar Zebari - Kurdistan Democratic Party of Iraq
52. Walid Mohamed Mohamed Saleh Sharika - Iraqi Turkomen Brotherhood Party
53. Yousef Ahmad Mustafa

Iraqi Accord Front - 44 seats

(Note: The Front boycotted the Council of Representatives from 2007-06-24 in protest at the suspension of the speaker, Mahmoud al-Mashhadani and the arrest warrant against Culture Minister As'ad al-Hashimi.Iraq's largest Sunni bloc boycotts parliament (Roundup) , Monsters and Critics, 2007-06-30 They ended their boycott 19 July after Mashhadani was reinstated. )

Note: Six members of the IAF have defected since their election

1. Ibrahim Ne'ema Thanoon
2. Ahmad Sulaiman Jameel
3. Ahmad Rakan Abd Al Azeez
4. Azhar Abd Al Majeed Husain
5. Usama Tawfeeq Mekhlef
6. Asma Adnan Mohamed
7. Asma Abd Alla Saleh
8. Ala Abd Alla Hmoud
9. Amal Seham Hamed
10. Amnah Ghadban Mobarak
11. Iyad Saleh Mahdi
12. Taiseer Najeh Awad
13. Jamal Mohsen Mousa
14. Hareth Mohei Al Deen Abed
15. Hasan Deikan Khdeir
16. Husain Shokor Hameed al-Falluji - resigned from the Front in July 2008 
17. Khalaf al-Ulayyan
18. Khalaf Mohamed Abed Al Mawla
19. Khalil Jdou'o Attia
20. Rafe'e Hiad Jiad
21. Raja Hamdoun Abd Alla
22. Salman Ali Hasan
23. Saleem Abd Alla Ahmad al-Jabouri
24. Shatha Munther Abd Al Razeq
25. Tariq al-Hashimi
26. Taha Khdeir Ftheil
27. Thafer Nathem Salman
28. Amer Habeeb Khaizaran
29. Abd Motlaq Hmoud
30. Abd Al Naser Kareem Yousef al-Janabi - resigned October 2007 and replaced by Ahmed Radhi
31. Abd Al Kareem Ali Yseen
32. `Adnan al-Dulaymi
33. Adnan Thiab Ghanem
34. Ezz Al Deen Abd Alla Husain al-Dawla He resigned from the Front in July 2008 
35. Alla Maki Abd Al Razeq
36. Omar Abd Al Sattar Mahmoud
37. Mahmoud al-Mashhadani
38. Methher Sa'adoon Awad
39. Naderah Aef Habeeb
40. Naef Jasem Mohamed
41. Nawal Majeed Hameed
42. Nour Al Deen Saeed Mousa
43. Hashem Yahia Ahmad
44. Wethab Shaker Mahmoud

Iraqi National List - 25 seats

1. Usama Abd Al Azeez Al Najafi
2. Iyad Allawi - Iraqi National Accord
3. Iyad Raouf Mohamed Jalal Al Deen
4. Jamal Abd Al Hadi Batekh
5. Hajem Mahdi Saleh al-Hassani (independent since Sep 2007 )
6. Husam Abd Al Kareem Abed Ali
7. Husain Ali Al Sha'alan (d. July 2007)
8. Hamid Majid Mousa - Iraqi Communist Party
9. Kheir Alla Kareem Kathem
10. Radwan Husain Abbas Al Kleidar
11. Sa'ad Sfouk Al Masoudi
12. Safia Taleb Ali al-Suhail (independent since Sep 2007 )
13. Aida Shareef Tawfeeq (died June 27, 2007?) 
14. Alia Naseef Jasem
15. Abd Al Lateef Abd Al Wahab Husain
16. Adnan Pachachi - Assembly of Independent Democrats
17. Ezzat Hasan Ali
18. Ghazi al-Yawar - The Iraqis
19. Falah Hassan al-Naqib
20. Mohamed Tawfeeq Husain
21. Mohamed Abbas Mohamed
22. Mofeed Mohaed Jawad - Iraqi Communist Party
23. Mahdi Ahmad Al Hafeth - Iraqi Independent Democrats (since May 2007 an independent)
24. Maysun al-Damluji
25. Wael Abdul Latif

Iraqi National Dialogue Front - 11 seats

(Note: The Dialogue Front boycotted the Council of Representatives from 24 June to 19 July 2007 in protest at the suspension of the speaker, Mahmoud al-Mashhadani and the arrest warrant against Culture Minister As'ad al-Hashimi )

1. Asa'ad Ibrahim Husain
2. Saleh al-Mutlaq
3. Ali Abd Alla Hmoud
4. Omar Khalaf Jawad
5. Falah Hasan Zeidan
6. Mohamed Ktouf Mansour
7. Mohammed Hassan Awad (died April 12, 2007 )
8. Mohamed Ali Mohamed
9. Mahmoud Thanoun Mahmoud
10. Mustafa Mohamed Ameen Mohamed Ali
11. Nada Mohamed Ibrahim

Kurdistan Islamic Union - 5 seats

1. Asmar Husain Ahmad
2. Zuhair Muhamed Ameed Rasheed
3. Sami Abd Alla Husain
4. Omar Ali Husain
5. Mohamed Ahmad Mahmoud

Reconciliation and Liberation Bloc - 3 seats

1. Abd Alla Iskandar Habeeb
2. Mohamed Al Jbouri Khlaf Hasan
3. Mesha'an Rkath Damen

The Upholders of the Message - 2 seats

1. Hasan Hashem Metsher
2. Naseer Kathem Obaid

Iraqi Turkmen Front - 1 seat

1. Saadeddin Arkej

National Rafidain List - 1 seat

1. Yonadam Kanna - Assyrian Democratic Movement

Mithal al-Alusi List - 1 seat

1. Mithal al-Alusi

Yazidi Movement for Reform and Progress - 1 seat

1. Ameen Farhan Jejo

Notes and references

 
Representatives
Iraq